Bauzi (also written Baudi, Baudji, Baudzi, Bauri) is a Papuan language of the East Geelvink Bay family spoken in the Indonesian province of Papua.

Dialects are Gesda Dae, Neao, and Aumenefa. Villages are Danau Bira, Itaba, Kustera, Neao, Noiadi, Solom, and Vakiadi. It is reported to use a mode of whistled speech.

Bauzi is the best documented East Geelvink Bay language, but may or may not be representative of the Geelvink Bay family as a whole.

Phonology
Consonants:
{| 
|  || t ||  || k || 
|-
| b || d || ʣ  || ɡ || 
|-
| f || s ||  ||  || h
|-
| v ||  ||  ||  || 
|-
| m || n ||  ||  || 
|-
|  || l ||  ||  || 
|}

Vowels:
{| 
| i || u
|-
| e || o
|-
| æ || 
|-
| a || 
|}

Pronouns
Bauzi pronoun roots are:

{| 
!  !! sg !! pl
|-
! 1
| e- || i-
|-
! 2
| o- || u-
|-
! 3
| a- || 
|}

Morphology
The two directional suffixes are:
-su ‘toward’
-to ‘away’

Aspectual suffixes are:
imperfective -da
perfective -ho
prospective -lo (homophonous with the verb ‘give’)
inceptive -le (homophonous with the verb ‘come’)
conative -so
resultative/stative -de
iterative -dete ~ -ia

Verbs
Bauzi verbs that have number agreement for singular and plural:
faito ‘cut down []’, fikboa ‘cut down []’
valo ‘pull out []’, vaomoa ‘pull out []’
esu ‘put []’, vahe ‘put []’
ai ‘stay [], esi ‘stay []’
ita ‘flee []’, ili ‘flee []’

References

Languages of western New Guinea
East Geelvink Bay languages